The 1992 Nippon Professional Baseball season was the 43rd season of operation for the league.

Regular season standings

Central League

Pacific League

Japan Series

See also
1992 Major League Baseball season

References

 
1992 in baseball
1992 in Japanese sport